Direct-coupled transistor logic (DCTL) is similar to resistor–transistor logic (RTL) but the input transistor bases are connected directly to the collector outputs without any base resistors. Consequently, DCTL gates have fewer components, are more economical, and are simpler to fabricate onto integrated circuits than RTL gates. Unfortunately, DCTL has much smaller signal levels, has more susceptibility to ground noise, and requires matched transistor characteristics. The transistors are also heavily overdriven; that is a good feature in that it reduces the saturation voltage of the output transistors, but it also slows the circuit down due to a high stored charge in the base.  Gate fan-out is limited due to "current hogging": if the transistor base-emitter voltages are not well matched, then the base-emitter junction of one transistor may conduct most of the input drive current at such a low base-emitter voltage that other input transistors fail to turn on.

DCTL is close to the simplest possible digital logic family, using close to fewest possible components per logical element.

A similar logic family, direct-coupled transistor-transistor logic, is faster than ECL.

John T. Wallmark and Sanford M. Marcus described direct-coupled transistor logic using JFETs. It was termed direct-coupled unipolar transistor logic (DCUTL). They published a variety of complex logic functions implemented as integrated circuits using JFETs, including complementary memory circuits.

References

Digital electronics
Logic families